Angoulême – Cognac International Airport, also known as Angoulême – Brie – Champniers Airport,  is an airport located  northeast of Angoulême, between Brie and Champniers, all communes of the Charente département in the Nouvelle-Aquitaine région of France.

Statistics

References

External links 
CCI d'Angoulême 
Aéroport d'Angoulême - Brie Champniers at Union des Aéroports Français 

Airports in Nouvelle-Aquitaine
Buildings and structures in Charente
Angoulême